Mary Boyle may refer to:

 Mary Boyle (psychologist), British clinical psychologist
 Mary Boyle, Countess of Cork and Orrery (1746–1840), British literary hostess
 Mary O. Boyle (born 1941), American politician of the Ohio Democratic party
 Mary Boyle (born 1970), six-year-old girl who went missing in County Donegal, Ireland in 1977